The 1905–06 Scottish Districts season is a record of all the rugby union matches for Scotland's district teams.

History

Glasgow District beat Edinburgh District in the Inter-City match.

Results

Inter-City

Glasgow District:

Edinburgh District:

Other Scottish matches

South of Scotland:

Anglo-Scots: 

Cities District:

Provinces District:

English matches

No other District matches played.

International matches

West of Scotland District:

New Zealand:

References

1905–06 in Scottish rugby union
Scottish Districts seasons